Purple Line may refer to:

Public transit

Asia 
Purple Line (Chennai Metro), Chennai, India
Purple Line (Namma Metro), Bangalore, India
Purple Line (Pune Metro), Pune, India
Purple Line (Bangkok), Thailand
North East MRT line, Singapore
Seoul Subway Line 5, Seoul, South Korea
Taoyuan Airport MRT, Taoyuan, Taiwan
Tseung Kwan O line, Hong Kong
Purple Line (Dubai Metro), Dubai Metro
Purple Line (Tel Aviv Light Rail), light-rail line under construction in Tel Aviv, Israel

United Kingdom 
Sheffield Supertram Purple Line, a tram line in Sheffield, England
Crossrail, London, England

Germany 
U6 (Berlin U-Bahn), Berlin

North America 
Purple Line (CTA), an elevated train line in Chicago, Illinois, U.S.
Purple Line (Maryland), a transit line currently under construction in Maryland counties bordering Washington, D.C.
Purple Line (San Diego Trolley), a proposed light rail line in San Diego County, California, U.S.
Purple Line (Pittsburgh), Pittsburgh, Pennsylvania
LYNX Purple Line, a proposed commuter rail line in Charlotte, North Carolina
E Line (RTD), a light rail line in and near Denver, Colorado, U.S.
IRT Flushing Line, a rapid transit line in New York City, serving the 7 <7> trains
MBTA Commuter Rail or Purple Line, in the Boston area, Massachusetts, U.S.
Norristown High Speed Line or Purple Line, a light rail line near Philadelphia, Pennsylvania, U.S.
Line 4 Sheppard, a subway line in Toronto, Ontario, Canada
Viva Purple, a bus rapid transit line in the Regional Municipality of York, Ontario, Canada
D Line (Los Angeles Metro), a subway line in Los Angeles, California
Metro Purple Line (Minnesota), a bus rapid transit line in Saint Paul, Minnesota
SFO–Millbrae line, former rapid transit line serving San Francisco International Airport, California, U.S.

Road transportation
 Purple Belt (Pittsburgh), Pittsburgh, Pennsylvania

Other uses 
 Purple Line (ceasefire line), the 1967 ceasefire line on the Golan Heights
"Purple Line" (song), a 2008 song by TVXQ
The Purple Line, the debut novel of Indian author, Priyamvada N Purushotham

See also
 Line of purples, a concept in color theory
Magenta Line (disambiguation)
Pink Line (disambiguation)
Violet Line (disambiguation)